Four ships of the Royal Navy have borne the name HMS Reindeer or Rein Deer, after the Reindeer:

 was an 8-gun packet brig launched in 1829, on harbour service from 1841 and sold in 1847. Despite this, she remained on the Navy lists until 1856.
 was a  wood screw sloop launched in 1866. Work had been suspended in 1865 but was subsequently restarted. She was broken up in 1876.
 was a  screw sloop launched in 1883. She was used as a boom defence vessel from 1904, and a salvage vessel from 1917.  She was sold in 1929.

There was also a requisitioned trawler launched in 1902 and named Reindeer.

See also

, an armed yacht that served in the Battle of the Atlantic and the Battle of the St. Lawrence.

References

Royal Navy ship names